Berit Carow (born 12 January 1981 in West Berlin, West Germany daughter of Klaus Carow) is a German rower. In 2006, she won second place the World Rowing Championships at the Dorney Lake, Eton, UK, and in 2007 the World Rowing Championships in Munich, Germany.  She represented her native country at the 2008 Summer Olympics in Beijing, China.

Club
In 2008, Carow rowed for RG Hansa Hamburg in her hometown, Hamburg.

References

1981 births
Living people
German female rowers
Olympic rowers of Germany
Rowers at the 2008 Summer Olympics
Rowers from Berlin
Rowers from Hamburg
World Rowing Championships medalists for Germany